Huari is one of the 16 districts that integrates the Peruvian Huari Province in the Ancash region. The district consists of the city of Huari, 15 small villages and 22 annexes.

History
Tradition says that Huari was founded by Juán Huarín. The foundation corresponded to the viceroyalty of Francisco de Toledo, Count of Oropesa in 1572, and was founded under the name of Santo Domingo de Huari. Its creation as a district was carried out during the Peruvian War of Independence.

Geography
The Cordillera Blanca traverses the western part of the district. Other mountains are listed below:

Located on the western skirts of the eastern mountain range in the Callejón de Conchucos valley (running parallel to the Callejón de Huaylas valley) Huari is characterised by its unique panoramas. The Mosna River feeds the Marañón River, which, in turn, gives birth to the Amazon River.

The Huari District is located 3,149 meters above sea level.

Demographics
The district occupies an area of 398.91 km2 and its population according to the Peru 1993 Census
was of 8,915 inhabitants.

Politics
The capital of the district is the city of Huari, which is also the provincial capital of Huari.

Ethnic groups 
The people in the district are mainly indigenous citizens of Quechua descent. Quechua is the language which the majority of the population (65.75%) learnt to speak in childhood, while 33.60% of the residents started speaking using the Spanish language (2007 Peru Census).

Religious figures and holidays
Haurinos holy patron include the Virgin of the Rosary (the Huarina Virgin is called to him), whose supervisory celebration is celebrated on the 7 of October, and Santo Domingo de Guzmán. Additional religious festivals include Easter and Corpus Christi.

Local food
Huarinos, in the region, are also referred to as mishi kanka, (Quechua for "roasted cat"). That is to say that Huarinos are people who eat roasted cat.

Other traditional plates of the district include sharp of guinea pig (traditional plate of the mountain culinaria of Peru) and the Llajhuari. The Llajhuari is a plate of Huari, and is a precursory of buffets; it consists of a mini-buffet of several "sharp ones" served on one plate (generally made of wood, called p'uku, Quechua for plate), accompanied, of course, of "poto" (vasija of pumpkin or zapallo) of chicha of jora. The word llajhuari, translated from Spanish, would mean: "something worthy to be licked".

Flora and fauna
Huari's unique flora and fauna include the waqanku (Masdevallia  amabilis), condors, pumas and the "spectacled" bear.

People
Eleazar Guzmán Barrón was a local biochemist who in 1942 was called by the Government of the United States to join the United States Atomic Energy Commission, overseeing the study and development of the atomic pump.

Economy
Main the economic activity of the district is agriculture, specifically coffee, apple and peach.

See also 
 Challwaqucha

References 

Districts of the Huari Province
Districts of the Ancash Region

lt:Varis (Peru)
qu:Wari (llaqta)